The BBC Radio 4 programme Desert Island Discs invites castaways to choose eight pieces of music, a book (in addition to the Bible – or a religious text appropriate to that person's beliefs - and the Complete Works of Shakespeare) and a luxury item that they would take to an imaginary desert island, where they will be marooned indefinitely. The rules state that the chosen luxury item must not be anything animate, nor anything that enables the castaway to escape from the island, for instance a radio set, sailing yacht or aeroplane. The choices of book and luxury can sometimes give insight into the guest's life, and the choices of guests between 1961 and 1970 are listed here.

1961

1962

1963

1964

1965

1966

1967

1968

1969

1970

Episodes (1961-1970)
1960s in the United Kingdom
Desert
1970s in the United Kingdom
1970s in British music